Modada Mareyalli is a 1991 Indian Kannada-language drama film starring Shiva Rajkumar and Yamuna, and directed by M. S. Rajashekar. It is a remake of the 1989 Malayalam film Kireedam. Modada Mareyalli was reported to be a commercial success.

Plot 
The story revolves around Ravi, the son of Panduranga Rao, a Police constable, who wishes to make his son an officer. Ravi, a recent college graduate, has many opportunities to enter different fields but he goes with his father's dream of becoming an Inspector. Panduranga gets transferred into a town whose residents are troubled by the rowdy Kari Kaala (Mohan Raj). The police force in the town turns a blind eye to the acts of Kari Kaala. One day Panduranga gets information that Kari Kaala is creating trouble in the  market place. Being an honest police man he goes on site to investigate where he takes him on. Hearing of trouble, Ravi too rushes to the market place. Panduranga is no match for the goon and Ravi tries to intervene before his father is killed. A fight ensues between Kari Kaala and Ravi and both are arrested by the police. Since he managed to defeat the reigning rowdy, Ravi is typecast a rowdy by the people of the town.

After recovering, Kari Kaala targets Ravi and his family. With the police failing to protect him, Ravi is forced to fight for his life and ends up killing Kari Kaala. Ravi is sentenced to prison for murdering Kari Kaala and hence is disqualified in being a Police Inspector. Head Constable Panduranga reads the Police Verification Report which states Ravi as a "notorious criminal".

Cast
 Shiva Rajkumar as Ravi
 K. S. Ashwath as  M. R. Panduranga Rao
 Yamuna as Devi (credited as Soumya)
 Mohan Raj as Kari Kaala
 Srinath
 Shivakumar as Keshava, Ravi's friend
 Honnavalli Krishna as Kitty
 Sadashiva Brahmavar as shopkeeper
 Girija Lokesh as Kaveri, Ravi's mother
 Papamma as Ravi's neighbour
 Sihi Kahi Chandru as Gunda, Ravi's uncle
 Sihi Kahi Geetha as Geetha, Gunda's wife
 Doddanna as Doddanna
 Shani Mahadevappa as Purushottam, a constable

Soundtrack

The duo of Rajan–Nagendra scored for the film's background and its film soundtrack, lyrics for which was penned by Chi. Udayashankar. The soundtrack album consists of four tracks.

References

External links 
 

1991 films
Kannada remakes of Malayalam films
1990s crime films
Films scored by Rajan–Nagendra
Films directed by M. S. Rajashekar
1990s Kannada-language films